Space Oz no Bōken (Japanese: スペースオズの冒険, Hepburn: Supēsu Ozu no Bōken,  Adventures of Space Oz) is an anime TV series based on the 1900 novel The Wonderful Wizard of Oz by L. Frank Baum. Produced by Enoki Films and E&G Films, the series originally premiered on October 5, 1992 and ran for a total of 26 episodes. 

In 1996, Enoki Films' North American division produced a 75-minute film edited from several episodes of Space Oz no Bōken, known as The Wonderful Galaxy of Oz; it was released on DVD by Digiview Entertainment in 2006.

Plot
In the year 2060, eight-year-old Dorothy and her dog Talk-Talk are swept off their home planet of New Kansas in the aftermath of a catastrophic storm. They end up in the Galaxy of Oz, where an evil witch known as Gloomhilda once ruled; eventually driven out by renowned scientist Dr. Oz, she now has her sights on reclaiming the galaxy and has amassed an army in the outskirts of space. Her attack, however, is foiled due to Dorothy's unexpected arrival.

Knowing that Gloomhilda will return, Dr. Oz plans to use three magic crystals previously thought to have been lost for hundreds of years (the Crystals of Love, Wisdom, and Courage) to rid the galaxy of her wickedness. Under Dr. Oz's guidance, Dorothy and an assortment of "heroes" set out to scour the Galaxy in search of the crystals.

Characters

Main characters
Dorothy
Toto
Dr. Oz
Plantman
Chopper
Lionman

Villains
Gloomhilda (Glumilda)

Music
Japan
 Opening Theme:  by Minami Aoyama Girl Opera Company
 Ending Theme:  by Yukari Morikawa

Episodes
 Dorothy Wanders Into The World of Oz (October 5, 1992) 
 The Surprising Secret of the King of Oz (October 12, 1992) 
 Mystery of the Crystal Empire (October 19, 1992)
 The World's Cowardly Hero (October 26, 1992) 
 The Sleeping Beauty of Mangabu (November 2, 1992)  
 Chopper's Heart (November 9, 1992) 
 Entrust Fashion to Me! (November 16, 1992)
 Baby-Sitter Crisis (November 16, 1992) 
 The Promise with Rockman Yabor (November 23, 1992) 
 Scrapia of Scrapper (November 30, 1992) 
 Grand Prix of Planet Car (December 7, 1992) 
 Dorothy's Santa Claus (December 14, 1992)
 Chopper's Lover (December 25, 1992)
 Escape from Planet Game (January 4, 1993) 
 Horror Birthday (January 11, 1993) 
 Planet Water Rescue Mission (January 18, 1993) 
 War of Toy Country (January 25, 1993) 
 Monster Panic (February 1, 1993) 
 Crowded Amusement Park (February 15, 1993) 
 The Planet Which Papa and I Defended (February 22, 1993) 
 Legend of Captain Garo (March 1, 1993) 
 Return to the Alherihit Hometown (March 8, 1993)
 Film Star Glumilda (March 22, 1993)
 The Reunion with Doctor Oz (April 2, 1993) 
 The Return of the Witch from the West (April 4, 1993) 
 Miracle of the Rainbow Crystal (April 4, 1993)

Cast

Japanese cast
Mariko Kouda - Dorothy
Hiroshi Takemura - Chopper
Noriko Kamimura - Glumilda
Ai Satou - Emily Obasan, Hagi
Eken Mine - Minister, Virtual President
Hidetoshi Nakamura - Yabor
Hirohiko Kakegawa - Bisuti
Ichiro Murakoshi - Dr. Oz, Moji's Father
Katsumi Suzuki - General of Oz, Toto
Kazuhiko Kishino - Santa
Kazuo Oka - Henry Ojisan, Paul's Father
Kenichi Ono - Jill
Kozo Shioya - Plante
Kumiko Nishihara - Azuma
Kumiko Takizawa - Queen
Mahito Tsujimura - Rakudo
Mami Matsui - Moji
Mari Adachi - Koras Girl, Maid
Mariko Ikegami - Nicholas
Miki Narahashi - Misha's Mother
Minoru Inaba - Alherihit
Mitsuo Chida - Robot A
Miyuki Matsushita - Rabbit, Sister
Narumi Hidaka - Teddy Bear
Natsumi Sakuma - Witch of the West
Reiko Suzuki - Mother
Rica Matsumoto - Baby Dinosaur
Ryuuzou Ishino - Hunter, Radio Voice
Satomi Koorogi - Misha
Shinobu Adachi - Toma
Shinpachi Tsuji - Baresuku, Captain, Hunter
Shōzō Iizuka - Oz
Takumi Yamazaki - Adjutant, Soldier A, Stag
Toshiyuki Morikawa - Athletic
Yasuo Muramatsu - King
Yuri Amano - Princess Shera
Yuri Shiratori - Lily
Yuuichi Nagashima - Hunter

See also
The Wizard of Oz adaptations — other adaptations of The Wonderful Wizard of Oz

References

External links

Shōnen manga
1996 films
Japanese animated fantasy films
Animated films based on The Wizard of Oz